John Smith Jr. (born May 24, 1944) is an American former professional basketball player. After a collegiate career at the University of Southern Colorado (now Colorado State University–Pueblo), the 7'0" center was drafted by the Los Angeles Lakers in the 1968 NBA draft as the 101st overall pick. He was also selected in the 1968 American Basketball Association (ABA) draft by the Dallas Chaparrals. His professional career lasted for two seasons, including three teams in the ABA and one in the Continental Basketball Association.

References

1944 births
Living people
American men's basketball players
Basketball players from Mississippi
Centers (basketball)
CSU Pueblo ThunderWolves men's basketball players
Dallas Chaparrals draft picks
Dallas Chaparrals players
Los Angeles Lakers draft picks
New York Nets players
People from Columbus, Mississippi
Pittsburgh Pipers players
Wilkes-Barre Barons players